HMS Cadmus was a wooden screw corvette launched on 20 May 1856 at Chatham Dockyard. On 4 January 1865, she ran aground at Chatham, Kent. She was refloated. Cadmus struck rocks at Salcombe on 5 June 1869 and was severely damaged. She was consequently beached. She was taken in to Plymouth the next day. She was broken up in 1879 at Devonport.

References

 

 

1856 ships
Pearl-class corvettes
Ships built in Chatham
Maritime incidents in January 1865
Maritime incidents in June 1869